Franklin José Virgüez Dun (born October 1, 1953 in Barquisimeto) is a Venezuelan actor.

His comic roles are very popular. He lives in Miami.

Filmography

Films

Television

References

External links
 

1953 births
Living people
Venezuelan male telenovela actors
Venezuelan emigrants to the United States